KRL may refer to:

 KRL (programming language), Knowledge Representation Language
 Karelian language, ISO 639 code
 Kereta Rel Listrik, an Indonesian term for electric multiple unit and commuter rail systems in Indonesia:
 KRL Commuterline, Greater Jakarta
 KRL Commuterline Yogyakarta–Solo, Greater Yogyakarta and Surakarta
 Khan Research Laboratories, a national laboratory in Pakistan
 Kinetic Rule Language, a rules-based event programming language
 IATA code for Korla Airport, China
 Kuka Robot Language, language used for programming KUKA robots